Estrildidae, or estrildid finches, is a family of small seed-eating passerine birds of the Old World tropics and Australasia. They comprise species commonly known as munias, mannikins, firefinches, parrotfinches and waxbills. Despite the word "finch" being included in the common names of some species, they are not closely related to birds with this name in other families, such as the Fringillidae, Emberizidae or Passerellidae.

They are gregarious and often colonial seed eaters with short, thick, but pointed bills. They are all similar in structure and habits, but vary widely in plumage colours and patterns.

All estrildids build large, domed nests and lay five to ten white eggs. Many species build roost nests. Some of the firefinches and pytilias are hosts to the brood-parasitic indigobirds and whydahs, respectively.

Most are sensitive to cold and require warm, usually tropical, habitats, although a few, such as the eastern alpine mannikin, mountain firetail, red-browed finch, and the genus Stagonopleura, have adapted to the cooler climates of southern Australia and the highlands of New Guinea.

Taxonomy
The family Estrildidae was introduced in 1850 by the French naturalist Charles Lucien Bonaparte as "Estreldinae", a spelling variant of the subfamily name. In the list of world birds maintained by Frank Gill, Pamela Rasmussen and David Donsker on behalf of the International Ornithological Committee (IOC) the family contains 139 species divided into 41 genera. Molecular phylogenetic studies have shown the family Estrildidae is sister to the family Viduidae containing the indigobirds and whydahs. The two families diverged around 15.5 million year ago. The most recent common ancestor of the Estrildidae is estimated to have lived around 10.9 million years ago. A genetic study of the Estrildidae by Urban Olsson and Per Alström published in 2020 identified 6 major clades. The radiations within these clades occurred between 4.5 and 8.9 million years ago. The authors proposed that each of these clades should be treated as a subfamily. This contrasts with an earlier proposal in which the family was divided into three subfamilies.

Genera list

References

External links
Zipcode Zoo: Estrildidae 
Internet Bird Collection.com: Estrildidae videos, photos and sounds  
Waxbill Finch Society — specialist waxbill bird society based in the UK''.

 
Bird families
.
.